Duke Island Park is a Somerset County Park in Bridgewater Township, New Jersey. The park includes trails, which are part of the Raritan River Greenway and currently connects the southwestern corner of Bridgewater with Raritan center and Hillsborough Township. The park is home to numerous trail, several sports fields, and a bandstand that has free summer concerts. The visitors center is home to the Park Ranger's office, restroom facilities, vending machines and maps and brochures of county facilities.

References

External links
Duke Island Park
County Parks Brochure

Bridgewater Township, New Jersey
Hillsborough Township, New Jersey
Raritan, New Jersey
Raritan River
Parks in Somerset County, New Jersey
County parks in New Jersey